Bowmans Creek is a river in Montgomery County, New York. It begins west of the hamlet of Hessville and just south of the hamlet of Ripple Corners. It then flows in a mostly southeast direction for a few miles passing through the hamlet of Sprout Brook before flowing into the Canajoharie Creek just east of the hamlet of Sprout Brook.

History
The river is named after Jacob Bowman, an early settler in the area. Around 1760 he bought a large tract of land near the creek. A number of Mr. Bowman's descendants reside in the area still.

Course
 Bowmans Creek begins west of the hamlet of Hessville and starts flowing eastward.

References 

Rivers of New York (state)
Rivers of Montgomery County, New York
Mohawk River